Southern mountain greenbul may refer to:

 Black-browed greenbul, a species of bird found in south-eastern Africa
 Yellow-throated greenbul, a species of bird found in Tanzania

Birds by common name